is a Japanese football player.

Playing career
Fukuoka was born in Nara Prefecture on June 27, 2000. He joined J2 League club Kyoto Sanga FC from youth team in 2018.

Career statistics

Updated to 20 July 2022.

References

External links

2000 births
Living people
Association football people from Nara Prefecture
Japanese footballers
J1 League players
J2 League players
Kyoto Sanga FC players
Association football midfielders